State Route 722 (SR 722) is a  state highway in Churchill County and Lander County in the U.S. state of Nevada. The highway is an old routing of U.S. Route 50 (US 50), and previously the Lincoln Highway. What is now route 722 crosses the Desatoya Mountains via Carroll Summit. The US 50 designation was removed from this alignment in favor of the modern route that traverses the Desatoya Mountains via New Pass Summit, which is  lower and with an easier approach on both sides than Carroll Summit.

Route description

SR 722 deviates from US 50 near the roadhouse at Middlegate. There is a small settlement at Eastgate. On the west approach to Carroll is an old, unmaintained rest area.

History
As a dirt road, the routing of the Lincoln Highway across Nevada changed several times. The route used an alignment that is now a dirt road called "Old Overland Road". At one time, the Lincoln Highway was routed on a route similar to the modern US 50 between Middlegate and Austin via New Pass.

The highway now numbered 722 was first constructed in 1924–1925 as part of improvements to the Lincoln Highway. While the route over Carroll Summit and Railroad Pass was shorter and more scenic, efforts began to revert to the New Pass Route as early as the 1930s. The route over New Pass Summit was being paved by 1967 and US 50 was re-routed back over New Pass Summit once finished.

Major intersections
Note: Mileposts in Nevada reset at county lines.

See also

References

External links
Nevada State Route 722 at Atlas Obscura

722
Lincoln Highway
U.S. Route 50
Transportation in Lander County, Nevada
Transportation in Churchill County, Nevada